William, Will or Bill Buckley may refer to:
 William Buckley (convict) (1780–1856), English convict
 William Edward Buckley (1817–1892), Rawlinsonian Professor of Anglo-Saxon at the University of Oxford
 William Frank Buckley Sr. (1881–1958), lawyer in Tampico, Mexico (father of William F. Buckley Jr.)
 Bill Buckley (Australian rules footballer) (1896–1946), Australian footballer
 Bill Buckley (rugby league) (1906–1973), Australian rugby league footballer and administrator
 William F. Buckley Jr. (1925–2008), American author and conservative commentator
 William Francis Buckley (1928–1985), U.S. Army officer and intelligence agency operative
 Bill Buckley (radio presenter) (born 1959), radio, television presenter and actor
 Will Buckley (footballer) (born 1989), English former professional footballer
 Will Buckley (journalist), journalist and author

See also 
 Cecil William Buckley (1830–1872), recipient of the Victoria Cross
 William Beckley (actor) (1930–2015), American actor